Charles Larrabee Street (April 25, 1891 - August 14, 1968) was a bishop suffragan of The Episcopal Church in the Diocese of Chicago.

References 

1891 births
1968 deaths
Episcopal bishops of Chicago